The Chota Nagpur Plateau is a plateau in eastern India, which covers much of Jharkhand state as well as adjacent parts of Chhattisgarh,  Odisha, West Bengal and Bihar. The Indo-Gangetic plain lies to the north and east of the plateau, and the basin of the Mahanadi river lies to the south.

Etymology
The name Nagpur is probably taken from Nagavanshis, who ruled in this part of the country.  Chhota (small in Hindi) is the misunderstood name of "Chuita" village in the outskirts of Ranchi, which has the remains of an old fort belonging to the Nagavanshis.

Formation

The Chota Nagpur Plateau is a continental plateau—an extensive area of land thrust above the general land. The plateau has been formed by continental uplift from forces acting deep inside the earth. The Gondwana substrates attest to the plateau's ancient origin. It is part of the Deccan Plate, which broke free from the southern continent during the Cretaceous to embark on a 50-million-year journey that was interrupted by the collision with the Eurasian continent. The northeastern part of the Deccan Plateau, where this ecoregion sits, was the first area of contact with Eurasia.

Divisions
The Chota Nagpur Plateau consists of three steps. The next part contains larger portions of the old Ranchi and Hazaribagh districts and some parts of old Palamu district, before these were broken up into smaller administrative units. The topography in undulating with prominent gneissic hills, often dome-like in outline. It covers the old Manbhum and Singhbhum districts. The large plateau is subdivided into several small plateaus or sub-plateaus.

Pat region
The flat topped plateau, locally known as pats are characterized by level surface and accordance of their summit levels shows they are part of one large plateau. Examples include Netarhat Pat, Jamira Pat, Khamar Pat, Rudni Pat and others. The area is also referred to as Western Ranchi Plateau. It is believed to be composed of Deccan basalt lava.

Ranchi Plateau

The Ranchi Plateau is the largest part of the Chota Nagpur Plateau. The plateau is highly dissected. The Damodar River originates here and flows through a rift valley. To the north it is separated from the Hazaribagh plateau by the Damodar trough. To  the west is a group of plateaus called pat.

There are many waterfalls at the edges of the Ranchi plateau where rivers coming from over the plateau surface form waterfalls when they descend through the precipitous escarpments of the plateau and enter the area of significantly lower elevation. Such falls are called scarp falls. Hundru Falls (75 m) on the Subarnarekha River near Ranchi, Dassam Falls (39.62 m) on the Kanchi River, east of Ranchi, Sadni Falls (60 m) on the Sankh River (Ranchi plateau) are examples of scarp falls. Sometimes waterfalls of various dimensions are formed when tributary streams join the master stream from great heights forming hanging valleys. At Rajrappa (10 m), the Bhera River coming over from the Ranchi Plateau hangs above the Damodar River at its point of confluence with the latter. The Jonha Falls (25.9 m) is another example of this category of falls. The Ganga River hangs over its master stream, the Raru River (to the east of Ranchi city) and forms the said falls.

Hazaribagh Plateau
The Hazaribagh plateau is often subdivided into two parts – the higher plateau and the lower plateau. Here the higher plateau is referred to as Hazaribagh plateau and the lower plateau as Koderma plateau. The north-eastern and southern faces are mostly abrupt; but to the west it narrows and descends slowly in the neighbourhood of Simaria and Jabra where it curves to the south and connects with the Ranchi Plateau through Tori pargana. It is generally separated from the Ranchi plateau by the Damodar trough.

The western portion of Hazaribagh plateau constitutes a broad watershed between the Damodar drainage on the south and the Lilajan and Mohana rivers on the north. Further east along the southern face a long spur projects right up to the Damodar river where it ends in Aswa Pahar, elevation . On all sides it has an exceedingly abrupt scarp, modified only on the south-east. Seen from the north the edge of this plateau has the appearance of a range of hills, at the foot of which (on the Koderma plateau) runs the Grand Trunk Road and NH 2 (new NH19).

Koderma Plateau
The Koderma plateau is also referred to as the Hazaribagh lower plateau or as the Chauparan-Koderma-Girighi sub-plateau.

The northern face of the Koderma plateau, elevated above the plains of Bihar, has the appearance of a range of hills, but in reality it is the edge of a plateau,  from the level of the Gaya plain. Eastward this northern edge forms a well-defined watershed between heads of the tributaries of Gaya and those of the Barakar River, which traverses the Koderma and Giridih districts in an easterly direction. The slope of this plateau to the east is uniform and gentle and is continued past the river, which bears to the south-east, into the Santhal Parganas and gradually disappears in the lower plains of Bengal. The western boundary of the plateau is formed by the deep bed of the Lilajan River.The southern boundary consists of the face of the higher plateau, as far as its eastern extremity, where for some distance a low and undistinguished watershed runs eastward to the western spurs of Parasnath Hills. The drainage to the south of this low line passes by the Jamunia River to the Damodar.

Damodar trough
The Damodar basin forms a trough between the Ranchi and Hazaribagh plateaus resulting from enormous fractures at their present edges, which caused the land between to sink to a great depth and incidentally preserved from denudation by the Karanpura, Ramgarh and Bokaro coalfields. The northern boundary of the Damodar valley is steep as far as the south eastern corner of the Hazaribagh plateau. On the south of the trough the Damodar keeps close to the edge of the Ranchi plateau till it has passed Ramgarh, after which a turn to the north-east leaves on the right hand a wide and level valley on which the Subarnarekha begins to intrude, south of Gola till the Singhpur Hills divert it to the south. Further to the east the Damodar River passes tamely into the Manbhum sector of lowest step of the Chota Nagpur plateau.

Palamu
The Palamu division generally lies at a lower height than the surrounding areas of Chota Nagpur Plateau. On the east the Ranchi plateau intrudes into the division and the southern part of the division merges with the Pat region. On the west are the Surguja highlands of Chhattishgarh and Sonbhadra district of Uttar Pradesh. The general system of the area is a series of parallel ranges of hills running east and west through which the North Koel River passes. The hills in the south are the highest in the area, and the picturesque and isolated cup-like Chhechhari valley is surrounded by lofty hills on every side. Netarhat and Pakripat plateaus are physiographically part of the Pat region.

Manbhum-Singhbhum

In the lowest step of the Chota Nagpur Plateau, the Manbhum area covers the present Purulia district in West Bengal, and Dhanbad district and parts of Bokaro district in Jharkhand, and the Singhbhum area broadly covers Kolhan division of Jharkhand. Adjacent Bankura district of West Bengal has been described as the “connecting link between the plains of Bengal on the east and Chota Nagpur plateau on the west.” The same could be said of the Asansol and Durgapur subdivisions of Bardhaman district.

The Singhbhum area contains much more hilly and broken country. The eastern part is mostly hilly, though near the borders of West Bengal it flattens out into an alluvial plain. In the Singhbhum area, there are hills alternating with valleys, steep mountains, deep forests on the mountain slopes, and, in the river basins, some stretches of comparatively level or undulating country. The centre of the area consists of an upland plateau enclosed by hill ranges. This strip, extending from the Subarnarekha River on the east to the Angarbira range to the west of Chaibasa, is a very fertile area. Saranda forest is reputed to have the best Sal forests in Asia.

Climate
The Chota Nagpur Plateau has an attractive climate. For five to six months of the year, from October onward the days are sunny and bracing. The nights are cool and temperatures in winter may drop below freezing point in many places. In April and May the day temperature may cross  but it is very dry and not sultry as in the adjacent plains. The rainy season (June to September) is pleasant.

Ecology

The Chota Nagpur dry deciduous forests, a tropical and subtropical dry broadleaf forests ecoregion, encompasses the plateau.

The ecoregion is drier than surrounding ones, including the Eastern Highlands moist deciduous forests that covers the Eastern Ghats and Satpura Range to the south, and the Lower Gangetic Plains moist deciduous forests in the lowlands to the east and north.

The plateau is covered with a variety of various habitats of which Sal forest is predominant. The plateau is home to the Palamau Tiger Reserve and other large blocks of natural habitat which are among the few remaining refuges left in India for large populations of tiger and Asian elephants.

The plateau is also swampy in some places and in other parts is covered with bamboo grasslands and shrubs such as Holarrhena and Dodonaea. The flora of the plateau is distinct from the wetter parts of India that surround it and includes a number of endemic plants such as Aglaia haslettiana and endangered plant species including Madhuca longifolia and Butea monosperma.

Tigers, Asian elephants, four-horned antelope (Tetracerus quadricornis), blackbuck (Antilope cervicapra), chinkara (Gazella bennettii), dhole wild dog (Cuon alpinus) and sloth bear (Melursus ursinus) are some of the animals found here while birds include the threatened lesser florican (Eupodotis indica), Indian grey hornbill and other hornbills.

More than half of the natural forest on the plateau has been cleared for grazing land and the scale of the mining operations on the plateau is disturbing to the movement and therefore the survival of wildlife including elephants and tigers.

Protected areas
About 6 percent of the ecoregion's area is within protected areas, comprising  in 1997. The largest are Palamau Tiger Reserve and Sanjay National Park.

 Bhimbandh Wildlife Sanctuary, Bihar (680 km2)
 Dalma Wildlife Sanctuary, Jharkhand (630 km2)
 Gautam Buddha Wildlife Sanctuary, Bihar (110 km2)
 Hazaribag Wildlife Sanctuary, Jharkhand (450 km2)
 Koderma Wildlife Sanctuary, Jharkhand (180 km2)
 Lawalong Wildlife Sanctuary, Jharkhand (410 km2)
 Palamau Tiger Reserve, Jharkhand (1,330 km2)
 Ramnabagan Wildlife Sanctuary, West Bengal (150 km2)
 Sanjay National Park, Madhya Pradesh (1,020 km2, a portion of which is in the Narmada Valley dry deciduous forests ecoregion)
 Semarsot Wildlife Sanctuary, Chhattisgarh (470 km2)
 Simlipal National Park, Odisha (420 km2)
 Saptasajya Wildlife Sanctuary, Odisha (20 km2)
 Tamor Pingla Wildlife Sanctuary, Chhattisgarh (600 km2)
 Topchanchi Wildlife Sanctuary, Jharkhand (40 km2)

Mineral resources
Chota Nagpur plateau is a store house of mineral resources such as mica, bauxite, copper, limestone, iron ore and coal. The Damodar valley is rich in coal and it is considered as the prime centre of coking coal in the country. The important coalfields in the basin are Jharia, Raniganj, West Bokaro, East Bokaro, Ramgarh, South Karanpura and North Karanpura.

See also
 Chota Nagpur Division
 Ecoregions of India

References

Further reading
 Gupta, Satya Prakash. Tribes of Chotanagpur Plateau: An Ethno-Nutritional & Pharmacological Cross-Section. Land and people of tribal Bihar series, no. 3. [Patna]: Govt. of Bihar, Welfare Dept, 1974.
 Icke-Schwalbe, Lydia. Die Munda und Oraon in Chota Nagpur - Geschichte, Wirtschaft und Gesellschaft, Abhandlungen und Berichte des Staatlichen Museum für Völkerkunde Dresden, Band 40; Akademie-Verlag, Berlin 1983
 Mukhopadhyay, Subhash Chandra. Geomorphology of the Subarnarekha Basin: The Chota Nagpur Plateau, Eastern India''. [Burdwan]: University of Burdwan, 1980.
 Sinha, Birendra K. Light at the End of the Tunnel: A Journey Towards Fulfilment in the Chotanagpur Plateau : a Study in Dynamics of Social-Economic-Cultural-Administrative-Political Growth. [S.l: s.n, 1991.
 Sinha, V. N. P. Chota Nagpur Plateau: A Study in Settlement Geography. New Delhi: K.B. Publications, 1976.
 Chakrabarti D.K. (1994c). Archaeology of the Chhotanagpur plateau and the Bengal basin. In: J.M. Kenoyer (ed.), From Sumer to Meluhha: Contributions to the Archaeology of South and West Asia in Memory of George F. Dales Jr, Wisconsin Archaeological Report, Volume 3, pp. 253–259. Madison: Department of Anthropology, University of Wisconsin
 Goswami Prodipto (2020). Untold Story of Chota Nagpur: Its Journey with the Colonial Army 1767-1947. Chennai Notion: Press, 2020

External links

 

.
Plateaus of India
Landforms of Jharkhand
Landforms of Chhattisgarh
Landforms of Odisha
Ecoregions of India
Tropical and subtropical dry broadleaf forests
Natural regions of Asia
Neighbourhoods in Jamshedpur